Splendrillia nenia is a species of sea snail, a marine gastropod mollusk in the family Drilliidae.

Description
The length of the shell attains 6.6 mm, its diameter 2.5 mm.

(Original description) The small, narrow, glossy shell is angled at the shoulder. It contains 5 whorls plus a smooth, tilted, globose, two-whorled protoconch. Its colour is pure white. Its sculpture shows curved, stout shouldered ribs, twelve on the body whorl. These mount the spire obliquely, become obsolete anteriorly, and terminate abruptly at each anal fasciole. The whole shell is covered by fine, close, microscopic growth striae. The base of the shell is contracted. The siphonal canal is short. The aperture is narrow. The anal notch is deep, with a raised, subtubular margin. The columella is slightly arched, overlaid by a thick callus sheet.

Distribution
This marine species is endemic to Australia and occurs off New South Wales, Queensland, South Australia, Victoria and Western Australia

References

 Hedley, C. 1903. Scientific results of the trawling expedition of H.M.C.S. "Thetis" off the coast of New South Wales in February and March, 1898. Mollusca. Part II. Scaphopoda and Gastropoda. Memoirs of the Australian Museum 4(6): 325–402, pls 36-37 
 May, W.L. 1921. A Checklist of the Mollusca of Tasmania. Hobart, Tasmania : Government Printer 114 pp. 
 Wells, F.E. 1990. Revision of the recent Australian Turridae referred to the genera Splendrillia and Austrodrillia. Journal of the Malacological Society of Australasia 11: 73–117 
  Tucker, J.K. 2004 Catalog of recent and fossil turrids (Mollusca: Gastropoda). Zootaxa 682:1–1295

External links

nenia
Gastropods of Australia
Gastropods described in 1903